The Constitution of the Marshall Islands is the supreme law of the Republic of the Marshall Islands, in force from 1 May 1979.

Its text is both English and Marshallese.

The Constitution was approved on 1 March 1979 by constitutional referendum, by 63% of voters.

History
Before the Marshall Islands become an independent state (1986), the Marshallese decided to have their own constitutional law in 1966. In 1976, a Constitutional Convention was organized with 46 elected members. This Convention drafted the Constitution of 1979, having into consideration a future independence status.

Structure

The Constitution of the Marshall Islands mixes British and American constitutional concepts based mainly on Westminster system, with a legislative branch that originates the executive branch, with an independent judicial branch.

The legislature is a bicameral institution, consisting of the Council of Irooij (Traditional High Chiefs) and the elected Nitijeļā (Parliament). The Nitijeļā is the law-making branch of the legislature and consists of 33 elected members, every four years. The Nitijeļā also elects from its members the President of the Marshall Islands and, on nomination by the President, other members of the parliament to serve as the Cabinet of the Marshall Islands. The Cabinet is the executive branch and directs the actions of the Government. The Cabinet is then responsible to the Nitijeļā for its executive actions.

The judicial branch consists of the Supreme Court of the Marshall Islands, the High Court of the Marshall Islands, the traditional rights court, district courts, and community courts.

References

External links
 Constitution of the Marshall Islands 

Marshall Islands
Government of the Marshall Islands
Law of the Marshall Islands